Ferdina is a genus of echinoderms belonging to the family Goniasteridae.

The species of this genus are found in Africa.

Species:

Ferdina flavescens 
Ferdina mena 
Ferdina sadhaensis 
Ferdina sadhensis 
Ferdina spec

References

Goniasteridae
Asteroidea genera